An epicanthic fold or epicanthus is a skin fold of the upper eyelid that covers the inner corner (medial canthus) of the eye. However, variation occurs in the nature of this feature and the possession of "partial epicanthic folds" or "slight epicanthic folds" is noted in the relevant literature. Various factors influence whether epicanthic folds form, including ancestry, age, and certain medical conditions.

Etymology 
Epicanthus means 'above the canthus', with epi-canthus being the Latinized form of the Ancient Greek  : 'corner of the eye'.

Classification 

Variation in the shape of the epicanthic fold has led to four types being recognised:

 Epicanthus supraciliaris runs from the brow, curving downwards towards the lachrymal sac.
 Epicanthus palpebralis begins above the upper tarsus and extends to the inferior orbital rim.
 Epicanthus tarsalis originates at the upper eyelid crease and merges into the skin near the medial canthus. This is the type most often found in East Asians.
 Epicanthus inversus runs from the lower eyelid skin over the medial canthus and extends to the upper lid.

Ethnogeographic distribution

High-frequency populations 
The highest frequency of occurrence of epicanthic folds is found in specific populations or ethnicities: East Asians, Southeast Asians, Central Asians, North Asians, Polynesians, Micronesians, Indigenous peoples of the Americas, Mestizos, and some African peoples (especially among Khoisan and Nilotic peoples). Among South Asians, they occur at very high frequencies among the Bhutanese, Northeast Indians, Kirati people and certain Adivasi tribes of eastern India.

In some of these populations the trait is almost universal, specifically in East Asians and Southeast Asians, where a majority, up to 90% in some estimations, of adults have this feature.

Lower-frequency populations 
Epicanthic folds also occur, at a considerably lower frequency, in other populations: Europeans (e.g., Scandinavians, English, Irish, Hungarians, Russians, Poles, Lithuanians, Latvians, Finns, Estonians and Samis), South Asians (Bengalis, Sinhalese, among other groups in eastern and southern South Asia), Nilotes, Cushites and Amazigh people.

Perception and attribution 

The degree of development of the fold between individuals varies greatly, and attribution of its presence or absence is often subjective, being to a degree relative to the occurrence of the trait within the community of the specific observer. Also, its frequency varies clinally across Eurasia. Its use, therefore, as a phenotypic marker to define biological populations is debatable.

Possible evolutionary function 
The epicanthic fold is often associated with greater levels of fat deposition around the eyeball. The adipose tissue is thought to provide greater insulation for the eye and sinuses from the effects of cold, especially from freezing winds, and to represent an adaptation to cold climates. It has also been postulated that the fold itself may provide a level of protection from snow blindness. Though its appearance in peoples of Southeast Asia can be linked to possible descent from cold-adapted ancestors, its occurrence in various African peoples is not open to this explanation. The epicanthic fold found in many African people has been tentatively linked to protection for the eye from the high levels of ultraviolet light found in desert and semi-desert areas.

The exact evolutionary function and origin of epicanthic folds remains unknown. Scientific explanations include either random variation and selection (presumably sexual selection), or possible adaption to desert environment and/or high levels of ultraviolet light found in high-altitude environments, such as the Himalayas.

Dr. Frank Poirier, a physical anthropologist at Ohio State University, said that the epicanthic fold among Asian people is often explained as part of an adaptation to severe cold or tropical environments, however he suggests that neither of these explanations are sufficient to explain its presence in East and Southeast Asia, and notes that the fold can also  be observed in Irish and African people. He attributes the epicanthic fold to pleiotrophic genes that control for more than one characteristic or function. He also did not offer an explanation for the origin of epicanthic folds.

Other factors

Age 
Many fetuses lose their epicanthic folds after three to six months of gestation. Epicanthic folds may be visible in the development stages of young children of any ethnicity, especially before the nose bridge fully develops.

Medical conditions 
Epicanthic fold prevalence can sometimes be found as a sign of congenital abnormality, such as in Noonan syndrome and Zellweger syndrome. Medical conditions that cause the nasal bridge not to develop and project are also associated with epicanthic fold. About 60% of individuals with Down syndrome (also known as trisomy 21) have prominent epicanthic folds. In 1862, John Langdon Down classified what is now called Down syndrome. He used the term mongoloid for the condition. This was derived from then-prevailing ethnic theory and from his perception that children with Down syndrome shared physical facial similarities (epicanthic folds) with those of Blumenbach's Mongolian race. While the term "mongoloid" (also "mongol" or "mongoloid idiot") continued to be used until the early 1970s, it is now considered pejorative and inaccurate and is no longer in common use since the 1970s about such medical conditions. In Zellweger syndrome, epicanthic folds are also prominent.
Other examples are fetal alcohol syndrome, phenylketonuria, and Turner syndrome.

See also 
 Blepharitis
 Epicanthoplasty, the surgical modification of epicanthic folds
 Human physical appearance

References

External links 
 

Human eye anatomy
Facial features
Skin anatomy
Eye